Mykhailo Stepanovych Khanenko (ca. 1620 – 1680) was a Ukrainian Cossack military leader, and nominal hetman of Right-bank Ukraine from 1669-74 in rivalry with Petro Doroshenko during The Ruin (Ukrainian history).

Biography
Khanenko was the son of Zaporozhian Cossack Stepan Khanenko. In 1656, he became a colonel (polkovnyk) of Uman regiment, and fought in the Khmelnytsky uprising. He was one of the cossacks who opposed the second Treaty of Pereyaslav (October 27, 1659) between Yuri Khmelnytsky and the Russian tsar, which drastically limited the Cossack autonomy. In 1661, he received a noble title from King John II Casimir of Poland.

In 1669, he was proclaimed Hetman of Right-bank Ukraine by three regiments. Khanenko and otaman Ivan Sirko led raids on Crimean Khanate and the Ottoman Empire. He was pro-Polish, and greatly opposed to rival Petro Doroshenko who he often fought, sometimes with Polish support.

In 1674, Khanenko suffered a disastrous defeat to Doroshenko, and was forced to get the aid of Left-bank Ukraine hetman Ivan Samoylovych. He renounced all claims to power, and swore loyalty to Moscow. He was allowed to live in peace on the left bank of the Dnieper and the exact time and place of his death are still unknown.

References 
Ihor Pidkova (editor), Roman Shust (editor), "Dovidnyk z istorii Ukrainy", 3 Volumes, "(t. 3), Kiev, 1993-1999,  (t. 1),  (t. 2),  (t. 3). Article: Ханенко Михайло 
Khanenko at the Encyclopedia of Ukraine

Zaporozhian Cossack nobility
Hetmans of the Zaporozhian Cossacks
Zaporozhian Cossack military personnel of the Khmelnytsky Uprising
1620 births
Year of birth uncertain

1680 deaths
People from Uman
Colonels of the Cossack Hetmanate
Mykhailo